Christian and Anna Keller Farmstead, also known as the Mel and Ruth Kohl Farmstead , is a historic home and farm located near Gerald, Franklin County, Missouri. The farmhouse was built by German immigrants between about 1855 and 1860, and is a -story banked brick dwelling.  Also on the property are the contributing small, two-story, gabled roof barn with a shed-roofed extension and cistern.

It was listed on the National Register of Historic Places in 2009.

References

Houses on the National Register of Historic Places in Missouri
Farms on the National Register of Historic Places in Missouri
Houses completed in 1860
Buildings and structures in Franklin County, Missouri
National Register of Historic Places in Franklin County, Missouri